The 2021 World Cup of Pool was a professional pool doubles tournament, and the 14th edition of the World Cup of Pool. The event was contested by 32 pairs representing different nations, and took place at the Stadium MK in Milton Keynes, England, from 9 to 14 May 2021.

The Austrian team of Mario He and Albin Ouschan were defending their 2019 title, but were knocked out in the first round by the Slovakian team of Jakub Koniar & Jaroslav Polách.

Prize fund
The total prize money for the event:
Winners (per pair): $60,000
Runners-up (per pair): $30,000
Semi-finalists (per pair): $15,000
Quarter-finalists (per pair): $9,000	
Last 16 losers (per pair): $4,500
Last 32 losers (per pair): $3,625

Teams
Each competing nation features two players, with the hosts, Great Britain, receiving three places (one being a last minute replacement for the Canadian pairing who were forced to withdraw due to travel issues). Also the Albanian pairing was replaced by France due to travel issues. The competing teams were made of the players below:

 A
 B
 C

Tournament bracket
Source:

References

External links

2021
2021 in cue sports
2021 in English sport
May 2021 sports events in the United Kingdom
2021 World Cup of Pool